Vanakkatukuriya Kathaliye is a 1978 Indian Tamil-language film directed by A. C. Tirulokchandar. The film stars Sridevi, Vijayakumar, Jai Ganesh, Rajinikanth and Jayachitra. It was released on 14 July 1978.

The film revolves around Shanthi, who has the ability to predict the future events. With her unique ability, Shanthi identifies several future events.

Plot

Cast 
Sridevi as Shanti and Jenny
Rajinikanth as Joe
Vijayakumar as Umashankar
Jayachitra as Deepa
S. V. Subbaiah as Sangaralingam
Manorama as Sevanthi
Jai Ganesh as Senthil
S. A. Ashokan as Thomas Alva
Thengai Srinivasan as Sevanthi's husband
K. Natraj as Doctor
Ganthimathi as Aunt
Veeraraghavan as Doctor
S. N. Parvathi as Umashankar's mother
A. R. S as Doctor
K. K. Sounder as Ramu
Oru Viral Krishna Rao
M. R. R. Vasu
 Sivakami

Soundtrack 
All songs were written by Vaali and composed by M. S. Viswanathan

Legacy 
The film had an introductory song to mark Rajinikanth's entry, a trend that would soon catch on in with his later films.

References

External links 
 

1970s Tamil-language films
1978 films
Films directed by A. C. Tirulokchandar
Films scored by M. S. Viswanathan
Indian black-and-white films